Saint-Urbain may refer to:

 Places
 Saint-Urbain, Finistère, a French commune in Finistère département
 Saint-Urbain-Maconcourt, a French commune in Haute-Marne département
 Saint-Urbain, Quebec, a parish municipality in Québec, Canada
 Saint Urbain Street, a major one-way street in Montreal, Quebec, Canada
 Saint-Urbain, Vendée, a French commune in Vendée département

 Businesses
 Saint Urbain, a New York City-based branding and advertising agency 

 Other uses
 St. Urbain's Horseman (TV series), a 2007 Canadian television drama miniseries
 Basilica of St. Urbain, Troyes, a large medieval basilica

See also
 Saint Urban (disambiguation)